Rokker Radio was a radio programme which has been broadcast on BBC Three Counties Radio since April 2006 for Romanies and the travelling community. The programme was discontinued late in 2008.

It is the only radio programme for Traveller Communities in the UK.

Background

Used to go out on Sunday evenings from 19:00 to 21:00. In August 2006, the programme expanded to several BBC Local Radio Stations across the east of England including BBC Radio Essex, BBC Radio Cambridgeshire and BBC Radio Norfolk. One of the secondary purposes of Rokker Radio is to educate the 'settled' community in the ways and lifestyles of People of No Fixed Abode, showmen, travellers (or those who would be).

The show was first produced by Karen Shrosbery, then Paul Scoins, David Landau and Victoria Cook and was presented by Romani journalist Jake Bowers.

See also
 English Travellers

External links
 Rokker Radio Facebook Page
 Jake Bowers' Travellers' Times

Notes

BBC Local Radio
BBC Local Radio programmes
Romani in the United Kingdom
Romani mass media
2006 radio programme debuts
2008 radio programme endings